The Song of Saya is a horror eroge 
visual novel by Nitroplus. The original plot was written by Gen Urobuchi, who took inspiration from reading Lovecraft novels during a lonely time in his life. 

In 2009, an English fan translation patch was released. Later, in 2013, JAST USA released an English localization on their digital platform using a revised version of the fan translation and also re-released it physically via the DVD-ROM format in 2020 for outlets such as J-list with a more modern VN engine. A Chinese version was also released by Kagura Games in co-publishing with JAST for Steam, also running on the new engine, though this version arrived heavily censored. The VN was released on GOG under the moniker of "Directors Cut", although no changes were made to the originally intended writing or visuals. 

A three-issue comic book based on Saya no Uta, called Song of Saya, has been produced by IDW Publishing. The monthly issues were released from February though April 2010. This westernized take was panned by critics for being unfaithful to the source material at best to avoiding and sanitizing the heavy and unsettling plot points touched on in the VN and not showing understanding of the original work at worst.

A feature film adaptation was in development by Sav! The World Productions, although no news has been shared since 2017.

Plot
Fuminori Sakisaka is a young medical student whose life changes when he and his parents are involved in a car accident, with Fuminori as the only survivor. However, his five senses become distorted after the life-saving brain surgery. He perceives his environment and people as hideous lumps of flesh and intestines, spoken words sound like grunts and screeches, regular meals taste and smell awful, and his sense of touch is also impaired. After a while, the bizarre perceptions affect his mental health, and he falls into severe depression. One day, as he contemplates suicide in the hospital, he meets Saya, whom he sees as a lovely young girl dressed in white. However, she is actually a horrific monster whose appearance drives people mad. Nevertheless, the two become close and move in together due to their circumstances, becoming lovers and incredibly dependent on one another.

Fuminori's cold attitude toward his friends (whom he also sees as hideous monsters) worries them. After Yoh, who has a crush on Fuminori, attempts to confess her feelings, her friend Omi goes to confront Fuminori— and promptly becomes food for Saya. With this incident, Fuminori unknowingly tastes human flesh, finding it delicious due to his warped senses. As Koji investigates Fuminori's strange actions, Saya visits Fuminori's neighbor, Yosuke, and changes his perception into the same as Fuminori's as an experiment. Yosuke, driven insane, kills his family and rapes Saya before being caught and killed by Fuminori.

From here, Saya offers to mend Fuminori's brain. If Fuminori accepts, his misperception disappears, but Saya leaves him, as she wishes for him not to see her pure form. Fuminori is arrested and confined in a mental hospital. Saya goes to look for her missing "father," Professor Ogai, while Fuminori swears to wait forever for her return.

If Fuminori declines Saya's offer, he will learn that he has killed his neighbor and eaten human flesh. Fuminori decides to take care of the suspicious Koji, driving him to Ogai's mountain cabin and attempting to murder him by pushing him into a well. Saya assaults Yoh before mutating her into the same being as Saya as part of a plan to give Fuminori a "family." This act puts Yoh through hours of torturous pain, and she is reduced to a sex slave for Fuminori's and Saya's desires.

Fuminori's neurologist, Doctor Ryoko Tanbo, saves Koji from the well, aware of Saya and already investigating Ogai. The two discover a secret chamber in the well and find Ogai's corpse and his research of Saya and her species. Next, Koji goes to Fuminori's home and discovers Omi's and the Suzumi family's flesh in his refrigerator. From here, Koji can either call Ryoko or Fuminori. If Koji calls Fuminori, the two confront each other at an abandoned sanctuary. Koji attempts to kill Fuminori but instead finds Yoh, who begs for him to kill her and end her pain. Koji, driven insane by her monstrous appearance, shoots her and beats her to death with a steel pipe before engaging with Fuminori. He overpowers Fuminori, but Saya intervenes and kills him. Saya then collapses and reveals that she is pregnant. She releases her flower petals as her "last gift" to Fuminori, who looks on in joy as the "petals" spread around the world, transforming humanity into the same beings as Saya. Ryoko, hiding in Ogai's mountain cabin, finishes transcribing the research, learning all she can about Saya and her race before resigning herself to her fate of mutation.

If Koji calls Ryoko, the two confront Fuminori. Koji still kills Yoh during the fight, but before Saya can kill him, Ryoko arrives and gives Koji liquid nitrogen, which he proceeds to throw on Saya, freezing her. Despite being mortally wounded by Fuminori, Ryoko still manages to shoot Saya and shatters the frozen body. Fuminori then commits suicide, with Saya dying alongside him. The bizarre incident leaves Koji, the sole survivor, with severe post-traumatic stress disorder. He also wonders if other aberrations like Saya exist in the world's dark corners. He buys a single bullet for his revolver in the hopes of committing suicide and finding solace in death when he cannot carry on anymore.

Characters

 (credited as Hikaru)
The protagonist of the game. A medical school student, he suffers a near-fatal traffic accident that kills his parents and leaves his perception of life permanently altered. As he wades through a "world gone berserk" of flesh and blood, he seeks the affection of the only thing he sees as normal—a mysterious girl named Saya, whom he falls madly in love with. Over time, due to Saya's influence, Fuminori views normal people with apathetic disdain and becomes willing to kill others without remorse with only Saya and, later, Yoh as exceptions. Unless he accepts Saya's offer of removing his agnosia, he gradually becomes a villain throughout the story: a ruthless killer, rapist, and cannibal, finding human flesh delicious through his twisted senses. In the American comic book release, he is known as Josh.

 (credited as Midori Kawamura)
Saya is a being from another dimension who materialized in this universe for the sole purpose of reproduction. She has no memories of where she came from and is guided only by her instincts. Due to Fuminori's condition, he perceives her as a beautiful young girl in a white dress. Still, in actuality, she is some sort of amorphous, tentacled, fleshy abomination that emits a putrid stench and produces slime. She preys on creatures of all sizes, from cats to human beings, typically killing them by snapping their necks or disembowelment through some unknown means, and then feasting on their internal organs. She is capable of projecting a strong acid, which she uses to digest her food before consuming it, and, in one case, to infiltrate a house by melting the glass of a window. Her true form is never fully revealed, as she immediately kills and consumes any third-party observers and notably because her visage is incomprehensible to humans, rendering them insane. The small amount of information regarding her original form is gleaned entirely from in-game descriptions, which themselves are somewhat vague and never go into detail.

 (credited as Dajitoro Kataoka)
Fuminori's friend. After Fuminori's accident, he has been trying to help Fuminori's life get back to normal. However, after Koji is almost killed by Fuminori and learns the truth of Fuminori's new character, Koji directly confronts Fuminori's actions and attempts to kill him, with or without the help of Ryoko, depending on the choices made.

 (Credited as Erena Kaibara)
Kōji's girlfriend and Yoh's best friend. Since Fuminori's accident, she has become worried about Yoh's sake. After Fuminori blatantly rejects Yoh, Omi goes to Fuminori's house to confront him, and Saya kills her there. Her dismembered remains are stashed in the refrigerator as food for Saya and Fuminori.

 (credited as Izumi Yazawa)
A friend of Fuminori who has a crush on him. Since his accident, she has been worried and heartbroken at his sudden change of attitude towards the world. During the story, Yoh is kidnapped and assaulted by Saya before being mutated into the same being she is over hours of tortuous transformation. Fuminori was then able to view Yoh as he formerly did afterward. However, the change caused Yoh unbearable pain, and she begs Koji to kill her later in the story. Koji's mind snaps from the sight of her monstrous form, and he beats her to death with a steel pipe in his horror and confusion.

 (credited as Makoto Sato)
The physician in charge of Fuminori's condition. She becomes suspicious that Fuminori has been hiding something during his routine checkups after he recovers from his injuries. She is revealed to be a stubborn and paranoid woman searching for the truth behind Ogai's heinous actions and becomes obsessed with killing Saya, the monster of her nightmares. Depending on the ending, Ryoko either lives and figures out the truth of Saya before mutating or dies in battle but manages to take Saya with her.

One of Fuminori's neighbors, a kindly yet somewhat judgemental man who likes to paint. He lives with his wife and daughter in a blissful lifestyle free of want. However, Yosuke's life is turned upside down when Saya changes his brain to the same as Fuminori's in an experiment. Yosuke then turns insane, kills his wife and daughter, who he now perceives as hideous monsters, before raping Saya. Fuminori kills him in revenge.

Former professor at the university hospital who disappeared after an incident at the hospital. Both Saya (who calls him "father") and Ryoko had tried to find him in the past, to no avail.

Soundtrack
Made by ZIZZ STUDIO.
"Schizophrenia"
"Sabbath"
"Seek"
"Spooky Scape"
"Song of Saya I"
"Song of Saya II"
"Sin"
"Sunset"
"Shapeshift"
"Scare Shadow"
"Scream"
"Savage"
"Silent Sorrow"
, sung by Kanako Itō
, sung by Kanako Itō

Reception
Richard Eisenbeis of Kotaku observed the game as being "known as one of the most messed-up games ever released", but praises how the game makes the player sympathize with the villains—"But perhaps the most fascinating thing about The Song of Saya is that somehow, in the middle of all the horrors it presents, it manages to make the abominable, beautiful."

Gen Urobuchi noted that the popularity of his later work Puella Magi Madoka Magica rekindled interest in Saya no Uta in 2011, so much so that Saya no Uta "made at least as much money as if it's a new game".

Notes

References

External links
 

2003 video games
Android (operating system) games
Bishōjo games
Eroge
2000s horror video games
Nitroplus
Visual novels
Windows games
Cannibalism in fiction
Video games developed in Japan
Video games set in psychiatric hospitals
Video games with alternate endings
Single-player video games
Lovecraftian horror
Anime and manga controversies
Video game controversies